Kuntar is a surname. Notable people with the surname include:

 Samir Kuntar (1962–2015), Lebanese politician
 Les Kuntar (born 1969), American ice hockey player

See also
 Kontar
 Kantar (disambiguation)